See also Harry Broadhurst

Henry Broadhurst (13 April 1840 – 11 October 1911) was a leading early British trade unionist and  a Lib-Lab politician  who sat in the House of Commons for various Midlands constituencies between 1880 and 1906.

Broadhurst was born in Littlemore, Oxford, the son of Thomas Broadhurst, a journeyman stonemason. He followed his father into stonemasonry at the age of thirteen and during the late 1850s spent a considerable period travelling the south of England, attempting to find work.  In 1865, he moved to London and worked on the Clock Tower of the Palace of Westminster.

In 1872, Broadhurst was elected as the Chair of a Masons' Committee during an industrial dispute.  After achieving a major victory, Broadhurst began working full-time for the Stonemasons Union.  He also became the union's delegate to the Trades Union Congress (TUC) and was elected to its Parliamentary Committee.  In 1873, he became the secretary of the Labour Representation League.

At the 1874 general election, two candidates sponsored by the League were elected, but Broadhurst was unsuccessful at High Wycombe.  In 1875, he was elected Secretary of the Parliamentary Committee of the TUC, the post which was later to become the General Secretaryship.

At the 1880 general election, Broadhurst was elected as the Liberal–Labour Member of Parliament for Stoke-upon-Trent.  Within the House of Commons, he pushed through legislation enabling working men to act as Justices of the Peace, and for all Government contracts to include a "fair wage" clause.  In 1884, he was appointed to the Royal Commission on the housing of the working class.

In 1885 general election, Broadhurst moved to represent Birmingham Bordesley.  He was appointed as Under-Secretary of State for the Home Department in the Liberal government, the first person from a working-class or labour movement background to hold a ministerial post.  He was the first minister to be granted permission not to attend levees.  Following his appointment, he resigned from his TUC post.  William Ewart Gladstone attempted but failed to have his ministerial salary reduced.

For the 1886 general election, Broadhurst moved seats again, this time winning Nottingham West.  Free of ministerial responsibilities, he was again elected Secretary of the Parliamentary Committee of the TUC, but became increasingly isolated as more left wing members, such as Keir Hardie, accused him of not sufficiently representing the interests of labour within Parliament.  Following a defeat in a crucial vote at the 1890 TUC conference, and citing declining health, Broadhurst resigned the post.

In 1892, Broadhurst was appointed to a second Royal Commission, on the aged poor.  He lost his seat at Nottingham West at the 1892 general election, and was also defeated at the 1893 Grimsby by-election.  However, he returned to Parliament as MP for Leicester at the 1894 Leicester by-election, holding this seat as a Lib–Lab MP until 1906.

Following his retirement, Broadhurst moved to Norfolk, where he became an alderman. He died at the age of 71.

Broadhurst married Eliza Olley, daughter of Edward Olley a journeyman currier at Norwich in 1859.

References

Oxford Dictionary of National Biography
Broadhurst, Henry, Henry Broadhurst, M.P.: the story of his life from a stonemason's bench to the Treasury Bench  (London: Hutchinson & Co., 1901); chapters on early life on-line on the Vision of Britain through Time web site.

Archives
 Catalogue of the Broadhurst papers at the Archives Division of the London School of Economics.

External links 
 
 

1840 births
1911 deaths
General Secretaries of the Trades Union Congress
Liberal Party (UK) MPs for English constituencies
Liberal-Labour (UK) MPs
UK MPs 1880–1885
UK MPs 1885–1886
UK MPs 1886–1892
UK MPs 1892–1895
UK MPs 1895–1900
Politicians from Oxford
Trade unionists from Oxfordshire
UK MPs 1900–1906
Members of the Parliamentary Committee of the Trades Union Congress
English autobiographers